The Karnak King List, a list of early Egyptian kings engraved in stone, was located in the southwest corner of the Festival Hall of Thutmose III, in the middle of the Precinct of Amun-Re, in the Karnak Temple Complex, in modern Luxor, Egypt. Composed during the reign of Thutmose III, it listed sixty-one kings beginning with Sneferu from Egypt's Old Kingdom. Only the names of thirty-nine kings are still legible, and one is not written in a cartouche (a border used normally to surround the name of a king).

It is not a complete list of the Egyptian pharaohs, as other kings are known from other ancient lists, but this list is valuable as it contains the names of kings of the First and Second Intermediate Periods, which are omitted in most other king lists.

It was first described by James Burton in 1825. In 1843, a German expedition directed by Egyptologist Karl Richard Lepsius was traveling up the River Nile to Karnak. A French adventurer, Émile Prisse d'Avennes, dismantled and stole the blocks containing the king list one night in order to secure it for France, and sent it home. Severely damaged, it is now on display at the Louvre in Paris.

Drawing of the list

Description of the list
The list features the name of the pharaoh followed by the actual one inscribed on the list. The list comprises three sections and is divided at the center. The numbering follows Lepsius, counting from the sides, toward the center.

Gallery

See also
 Abydos King List
 Manetho King List
 Palermo Stone
 Saqqara Tablet
 Turin King List or Turin Papyrus
 Medinet Habu king list

Notes

External links

 Lepsius drawing from APAW 1852 from Berlin-Brandenburgische Akademie der Wissenschaften
 Karnak king list with complete hieroglyphics, sources and pictures

15th-century BC literature
1825 archaeological discoveries
Karnak temple complex
Ancient Egyptian King lists
Thutmose III